Thomas Carrigan (April 13, 1886 in Lapeer - October 2, 1941) was an actor who starred in silent films in the U.S. He appeared in early Selig films and played dime store novel detective character Nick Carter in a series of short films.

Filmography
Told in Colorado (1911)
Western Hearts (1911)
Why the Sheriff is a Bachelor (1911)
Saved by the Pony Express (1911)
A Cry at Midnight (1916)
Dimples (1916 film)
Rose of the Alley (1916)
Lovely Mary (1916)
Peggy, the Will O' the Wisp (1917)
Somewhere in America (film) (1917)
Checkers (1919 film)
The Truth (1920 film)
The Tiger's Cub (1920)
In Walked Mary (1920)
Room and Board (1921)
Room and Board (film) (1921)
Salomy Jane (1923 film)
You Can't Fool Your Wife (1923 film)
Boston Blackie
Crooked Alley (1923)
The Making of O'Malley (1925)
The Big Broadcast(1932)
Air Mail (film) (1932)

References

1941 deaths
1886 births
American male film actors
American male silent film actors
20th-century American male actors
People from Lapeer, Michigan